This is a list of television broadcasters which provide coverage of the Argentine Primera División (named "Liga Profesional de Fútbol" since the 2020 season) around the world.

Argentina

International broadcasters

International

Americas

Europe

Middle East and North Africa

Asia

Africa

Oceania

References 

Association football on television
Argentine Primera División
Argentine Primera División